The 1948 North Dakota gubernatorial election was held on November 2, 1948. Incumbent Republican Fred G. Aandahl defeated Democratic nominee Howard I. Henry with 61.33% of the vote.

Primary elections
Primary elections were held on June 29, 1948.

Democratic primary

Candidates
Howard I. Henry

Results

Republican primary

Candidates
Fred G. Aandahl, incumbent Governor
Ervin Schumacher

Results

General election

Candidates
Major party candidates
Fred G. Aandahl, Republican 
Howard I. Henry, Democratic

Other candidates
H. A. Porter, Progressive
George Lund, Socialist

Results

References

1948
North Dakota
Gubernatorial